The Split Program II is the second split album of German metalcore bands Caliban and Heaven Shall Burn. It was released through Lifeforce Records on 26 July 2005.

Track listing

Credits 
Performance and production credits are adapted from the album liner notes.

Part I. Heaven Shall Burn

Personnel 
Heaven Shall Burn
 Marcus Bischoff – vocals
 Patrick Schleitzer – guitar
 Maik Weichert – guitar
 Eric Bischoff – bass
 Matthias Voigt – drums

Additional musicians
 Ralf Müller – samples, keyboards
 Greta Salóme Stefánsdóttir – violin on "Nyfædd Von"
 Thordur Gudmundur Hermannson – cello on "Nyfædd Von"
 Ólafur Arnalds – piano on "Nyfædd Von"

Production
 Patrick W. Engel – production
 Maik Weichert – co-production
 Alexander Dietz – co-production, engineering
 Ralf Müller – engineering
 Tue Madsen – mixing, mastering
 Ólafur Arnalds – production, mixing of "Nyfædd Von"

Studios 
 The Rape of Harmonies Studio, Germany – recording
 Studio Oloniti, Iceland – production, mixing of "Nyfædd Von"
 The Antfarm, Denmark – mixing, mastering

Part II. Caliban

Personnel 
Caliban
 Andreas Dörner – vocals
 Marc Görtz – guitar
 Denis Schmidt – guitar, vocals
 Marco Schaller – bass
 Patrick Grün – drums

Production
 Tue Madsen – mixing, mastering

Studios 
 Principal Studios, Senden, Germany – recording
 The Antfarm, Denmark – mixing, mastering

References

External links 

2005 albums
Caliban (band) albums
Heaven Shall Burn albums
Split albums
Lifeforce Records albums